Lichtblau is a surname. Notable people with the surname include:

Eric Lichtblau (born 1965), American journalist
Ernst Lichtblau (1883–1963), Austrian architect and designer
Franz Lichtblau, German architect
Leon Lichtblau (1901–1938), Romanian socialist and communist militant, and Soviet statistician